Rebecca Barry is a film and television director and producer. In 2012, she co-founded the independent production company Media Stockade with Madeleine Hetherton-Miau.

Barry graduated from the Australian Film Television and Radio School (AFTRS) in 2003.

Her first feature film I Am A Girl (2013) was nominated for 4 AACTA awards including Best Direction in a Documentary and Best Direction in a Documentary Feature at the Australian Directors' Guild Awards. Barry was awarded the June Andrews Award for Women's Leadership in Media 2020 for Power Meri (2018).

Filmography

References

Living people
Year of birth missing (living people)
Australian film directors